Chukwuemeka "Emeka" Nwajiobi (born 25 May 1959) is a former professional footballer. He had a short footballing career but became a firm favourite with the Luton Town fans in the mid-1980s.

Career
Nwajiobi started out in non-league playing for Barking and then Dulwich Hamlet in the Isthmian League Premier Division. He moved to Luton Town in late 1983, made his debut in 1984 and played until 1988 when a severe injury ended his career. He played in the notorious 1985 Kenilworth Road riot game when spectators from the Millwall enclosure invaded the pitch and damaged the stands prior to the match.

During this period he played four times for the Nigeria national team.

After retirement from football, Nwajiobi pursued a career in pharmacy.

Nwajiobi was followed into football, also at Dulwich Hamlet, by his younger brother Ifeanyi 'Nigel' Nwajiobi.

External links
 Profile at Luton fans page
 Profile at Official Luton Town site 'great hatters'
 Barking F.C. Archives

Living people
1959 births
Nigerian footballers
Association football wingers
Nigeria international footballers
Barking F.C. players
Dulwich Hamlet F.C. players
Luton Town F.C. players
Nigerian expatriate footballers
Nigerian expatriate sportspeople in England
Expatriate footballers  in England